Jhoanis Carlos Portilla (born 24 July 1990) is a Cuban hurdler. He competed in the 110 metres hurdles event at the 2015 World Championships in Beijing reaching the semifinals. His personal bests are 13.30 seconds in the 110 metres hurdles (+0.8 m/s, Toronto 2015) and 7.74 seconds in the 60 metres hurdles (Sopot 2014).

Competition record

References

External links

1990 births
Living people
Cuban male hurdlers
World Athletics Championships athletes for Cuba
Place of birth missing (living people)
Athletes (track and field) at the 2015 Pan American Games
Athletes (track and field) at the 2016 Summer Olympics
Olympic athletes of Cuba
Central American and Caribbean Games silver medalists for Cuba
Competitors at the 2014 Central American and Caribbean Games
Central American and Caribbean Games medalists in athletics
Pan American Games competitors for Cuba
20th-century Cuban people
21st-century Cuban people